This is a list of notable Azerbaijani opera singers, which is arranged alphabetically.

A 
 Abulfat Aliyev
 Ahmed Agdamski
 Sona Aslanova, soprano
 Elchin Azizov, baritone

B 
 Bulbul, tenor

G 
 Fidan Gasimova, soprano
 Khuraman Gasimova

H 
 Gulkhar Hasanova
 Sarabski Huseyngulu, tenor

I 
 Lutfiyar Imanov, tenor

M 
 Muslim Magomayev, baritone
 Shovkat Mammadova, soprano
 Fatma Mukhtarova, mezzo-soprano
 Rubaba Muradova, mezzo-soprano

R 
 Hagigat Rzayeva

S 
 Huseyngulu Sarabski, tenor

 
Lists of musicians by nationality
Opera singers
Opera-related lists